Periyar Nagar, named after the Tamil leader Periyar E. V. Ramasamy is a developed residential area in North Chennai, a metropolitan city,which is developed in short time in Tamil Nadu, India.

Location
Periyar Nagar is located near Kollathur, ayanavaram, villivakkam and perambur
It is well connected by train and bus transport. It is very close to Perambur, Loco Works Railway Stations.

Hospitals
Government Peripheral Hospital, Periyar Nagar 
Cure Advanced Dental Care
Dr. Agarwals Eye Hospital
Eswari Nursing Home
Sheeba Nursing Home 
KKR Ent Clinic

Surroundings

Neighbourhoods in Chennai
Periyar E. V. Ramasamy